Sportanlage Blumenau is a football stadium in Triesen, Liechtenstein. It has a capacity of 2,100 and is the home of FC Triesen.

See also
List of football stadiums in Liechtenstein

Football venues in Liechtenstein
Athletics (track and field) venues in Liechtenstein
Sport in Triesen